Nestor Falls/Sabaskong Bay Water Aerodrome  is located on Sabaskong Bay near Nestor Falls, Ontario, Canada.

See also
 Nestor Falls Airport
 Nestor Falls Water Aerodrome

References

Registered aerodromes in Kenora District
Seaplane bases in Ontario